The Gjemnessund Bridge is a suspension bridge that crosses the Gjemnessundet strait between the mainland and the island of Bergsøya in the municipality of Gjemnes in Møre og Romsdal county, Norway. The  bridge was the longest suspension bridge in Norway until the opening of the Hardanger Bridge in 2013, although it did not have the longest span, being eclipsed by the Askøy Bridge. 

It was built as part of the Krifast project, the mainland road connection of the city of Kristiansund (along with the Freifjord Tunnel and the Bergsøysund Bridge).

Many bridges slowly deteriorate and need to be repaired because the salty seawater damages the concrete and the iron inside it. The Gjemnessund Bridge has had a problem with seabirds, whose manure contain salt and ammonia. The salt and ammonia damages the concrete. To prevent this, the bridge is cleaned, and the critical parts of the concrete are covered with an elastic membrane that protects the concrete against the manure and the harmful content.

References

Bridges in Møre og Romsdal
Suspension bridges in Norway
Bridges completed in 1992
Gjemnes
1992 establishments in Norway
European route E39 in Norway
Road bridges in Norway